Kirrak was a railway branch line, it was built in 1939 to service the Kirrak Coal mine located near the town of Wonthaggi, Australia. The last day of operation of the mine was Fri.20.12.68.  Monash Railway Club chartered the local 102 hp [75 kW] Walker railmotor to travel to State mine and to Kirrak mine that day.  The last wagons of coal were not removed from Kirrak until the end of the month.  All references to the line were removed from railway records in 1976.  The photo in the external link was taken at State mine, not at Kirrak.

References

External links
 State Mine after closing with Walker Railcar in picture

Closed regional railway lines in Victoria (Australia)
Transport in Gippsland (region)
Bass Coast Shire